This is a list of episodes for the third season of Lou Grant.

Episodes

1979 American television seasons
1980 American television seasons
Lou Grant (TV series) seasons